Maureen Caird (born 29 September 1951) is an Australian former track athlete, who specialised in the sprint hurdles. At the 1968 Summer Olympics, she became the youngest-ever individual Olympic athletics champion at the time, at age 17, when she won gold in Mexico City.

Early career
Born in Cumberland, New South Wales, Caird began competing in athletics as a teenager, trained by the former coach of quadruple Olympic champion Betty Cuthbert, June Ferguson.

Caird competed in several events, but the 80 m hurdles was her best. In 1967 she won both the junior (under 18) 80 metre hurdles and pentathlon at the Australian Championships.

In the 1968 Championships, she defended her junior hurdles crown and also won the Long Jump. Caird also competed in senior events, placing second in both the 80 metres and 100 metres hurdles behind Pam Kilborn who was rated as the world's best female hurdler.

Caird's performances earned her selection in the Australian team to compete at the 1968 Summer Olympics.

International career
At the Games, Caird, only 17 at the time, was the youngest member of the Australian team.Competition was very strong with defending champion Karin Balzer(East Germany)and World record holder Vera Korsakova (10.2 hand timed) from the USSR. Soon to be superstar Chi Cheng from Taiwan was also in this race. Both Maureen and her rival Pamela Kilborn made the final, which was held in wet conditions. To the surprise of most observers, Maureen crossed the line just .07secs ahead of her fellow Australian, in a new electronic world record time of 10.39. This upset made Maureen Caird the youngest individual Olympic champion in athletics (at the time, that record was broken by Ulrike Meyfarth in 1972) and earned her the world number one ranking.Because this was the last time the 80m event was contested, Maureen's Olympic record will last forever.

At the 1970 Commonwealth Games, she finished second behind Kilborn in the 100 m hurdles(which had replaced the 80 m internationally)—this was despite suffering from glandular fever during the event.
Prior to these Games Maureen had won the 1970 Australian titles in both the 100m and 200m hurdles,defeating Pamela Kilborn and setting world records in the latter on 2 occasions.

Her attempt to defend her Olympic title in 1972 was unsuccessful and she did not make it past the heats.Maureen ran the first leg for Australia in the 4x100m relay and they finished 6th in the final.
Maureen Caird retired due to stomach pains that were later diagnosed as cancer.

Personal life
Caird, now married as Maureen Jones, currently lives in Australia.

Honours
Caird was inducted into the Sport Australia Hall of Fame in 1986. In 2000, she received an Australian Sports Medal.

References

1951 births
Living people
Australian female hurdlers
Sportswomen from New South Wales
Athletes (track and field) at the 1968 Summer Olympics
Athletes (track and field) at the 1972 Summer Olympics
Olympic athletes of Australia
Olympic gold medalists for Australia
Commonwealth Games silver medallists for Australia
Athletes (track and field) at the 1970 British Commonwealth Games
Recipients of the Australian Sports Medal
Sport Australia Hall of Fame inductees
Medalists at the 1968 Summer Olympics
Commonwealth Games medallists in athletics
Olympic gold medalists in athletics (track and field)
Medallists at the 1970 British Commonwealth Games